Static timing analysis (STA) is a simulation method of computing the expected timing of a synchronous digital circuit without requiring a simulation of the full circuit.

High-performance integrated circuits have traditionally been characterized by the clock frequency at which they operate. Measuring the ability of a circuit to operate at the specified speed requires an ability to measure, during the design process, its delay at numerous steps. Moreover, delay calculation must be incorporated into the inner loop of timing optimizers at various phases of design, such as logic synthesis, layout (placement and routing), and in in-place optimizations performed late in the design cycle. While such timing measurements can theoretically be performed using a rigorous circuit simulation, such an approach is liable to be too slow to be practical. Static timing analysis plays a vital role in facilitating the fast and reasonably accurate measurement of circuit timing. The speedup comes from the use of simplified timing models and by mostly ignoring logical interactions in circuits. This has become a mainstay of design over the last few decades.

One of the earliest descriptions of a static timing approach was based on the Program Evaluation and Review Technique (PERT), in 1966.  More modern versions and algorithms appeared in the early 1980s.

Purpose 
In a synchronous digital system, data is supposed to move in lockstep, advancing one stage on each tick of the clock signal. This is enforced by synchronizing elements such as flip-flops or latches, which copy their input to their output when instructed to do so by the clock. Only two kinds of timing errors are possible in such a system:
A Max time violation, when a signal arrives too late, and misses the time when it should advance. These are more commonly known as setup violations/checks which actually are a subset of max time violations involving a cycle shift on synchronous paths.
A Min time violation, when an input signal changes too soon after the clock's active transition. These are more commonly known as hold violations/checks which actually are a subset of min time violations in synchronous path.

The time when a signal arrives can vary due to many reasons. The input data may vary, the circuit may perform different operations, the temperature and voltage may change, and there are manufacturing differences in the exact construction of each part. The main goal of static timing analysis is to verify that despite these possible variations, all signals will arrive neither too early nor too late, and hence proper circuit operation can be assured.

Since STA is capable of verifying every path, it can detect other problems like glitches, slow paths and clock skew.

Definitions 
 The critical path is defined as the path between an input and an output with the maximum delay. Once the circuit timing has been computed by one of the techniques listed below, the critical path can easily be found by using a traceback method.
 The arrival time of a signal is the time elapsed for a signal to arrive at a certain point. The reference, or time 0.0, is often taken as the arrival time of a clock signal. To calculate the arrival time, delay calculation of all the components in the path will be required. Arrival times, and indeed almost all times in timing analysis, are normally kept as a pair of values - the earliest possible time at which a signal can change, and the latest.
 Another useful concept is required time. This is the latest time at which a signal can arrive without making the clock cycle longer than desired.  The computation of the required time proceeds as follows: at each primary output, the required times for rise/fall are set according to the specifications provided to the circuit. Next, a backward topological traversal is carried out, processing each gate when the required times at all of its fanouts are known.
 The slack associated with each connection is the difference between the required time and the arrival time. A positive slack s at some node implies that the arrival time at that node may be increased by s, without affecting the overall delay of the circuit. Conversely, negative slack implies that a path is too slow, and the path must be sped up (or the reference signal delayed) if the whole circuit is to work at the desired speed.

Corners and STA
Quite often, designers will want to qualify their design across many conditions. Behavior of an electronic circuit is often dependent on various factors in its environment like temperature or local voltage variations. In such a case either STA needs to be performed for more than one such set of conditions, or STA must be prepared to work with a range of possible delays for each component, as opposed to a single value. 

With proper techniques, the patterns of condition variations are characterized and their extremes are recorded. Each extreme condition can be termed as a corner. Extremes in cell characteristics can be considered as ‘process, voltage and temperature (PVT) corners’ and extremes in net characteristics can be considered as ‘extraction corners’. Then each combination pattern of PVT extraction corners is referred to as a ‘timing corner’ as it represents a point where timing will be extreme. If the design works at each extreme condition, then under the assumption of monotonic behavior, the design is also qualified for all intermediate points.

The use of corners in static timing analysis has several limitations. It may be overly optimistic, since it assumes perfect tracking: if one gate is fast, all gates are assumed fast, or if the voltage is low for one gate, it is also low for all others. Corners may also be overly pessimistic, for the worst case corner may seldom occur. In an IC, for example, it may not be rare to have one metal layer at the thin or thick end of its allowed range, but it would be very rare for all 10 layers to be at the same limit, since they are manufactured independently. Statistical STA, which replaces delays with distributions, and tracking with correlation, offers a more sophisticated approach to the same problem.

The most prominent techniques for STA 
In static timing analysis, the word static alludes to the fact that this timing analysis is carried out in an input-independent manner, and purports to find the worst-case delay of the circuit over all possible input combinations. The computational efficiency (linear in the number of edges in the graph) of such an approach has resulted in its widespread use, even though it has some limitations. A method that is commonly referred to as PERT is popularly used in STA. However, PERT is a misnomer, and the so-called PERT method discussed in most of the literature on timing analysis refers to the critical path method (CPM) that is widely used in project management. While the CPM-based methods are the dominant ones in use today, other methods for traversing circuit graphs, such as depth-first search, have been used by various timing analyzers.

Interface timing analysis 
Many of the common problems in chip designing are related to interface timing between different components of the design. These can arise because of many factors including incomplete simulation models, lack of test cases to properly verify interface timing, requirements for synchronization, incorrect interface specifications, and lack of designer understanding of a component supplied as a 'black box'. There are specialized CAD tools designed explicitly to analyze interface timing, just as there are specific CAD tools to verify that an implementation of an interface conforms to the functional specification (using techniques such as model checking).

Statistical static timing analysis (SSTA) 
Statistical static timing analysis (SSTA) is a procedure that is becoming increasingly necessary to handle the complexities of process and environmental variations in integrated circuits.

See also
 Dynamic timing verification
 Electronic design automation
 Integrated circuit design
 Logic analyzer—for verification of STA
 Logic simulation
 Simulation
 Timing margin
 Worst-case execution time
 Signoff (electronic design automation)

Notes

References 
Electronic Design Automation For Integrated Circuits Handbook, by Lavagno, Martin, and Scheffer,  A survey of the field. This article was derived from Volume II, Chapter 8, 'Static Timing Analysis' by Sachin Sapatnekar, with permission.
Static Timing Analysis for Nanometer Designs, by R. Chadha and J. Bhasker, Springer, 2009.

Timing in electronic circuits
Formal methods